Hendrik Antonie Lodewijk Hamelberg (Zaltbommel, 2 May 1826 – Arnhem, Netherlands, 29 September 1896) was a Dutch lawyer who settled in the Orange Free State, where he became a member of the Volksraad. After his return to the Netherlands he acted as consul general and special envoy for that republic in Europe (1871-1896).

1826 births
1896 deaths
Dutch emigrants to South Africa
Members of the Volksraad of the Orange Free State
People from Zaltbommel
South African diplomats